Valentin Milyukov (born September 24, 1992) is a Kazakhstani professional ice hockey defenceman. He is currently playing with Avangard Omsk of the Kontinental Hockey League (KHL).

Milyukov made his Kontinental Hockey League debut playing with Avangard Omsk during the 2013–14 KHL season.

References

External links

1992 births
Living people
Avangard Omsk players
Kazakhstani ice hockey defencemen
Sportspeople from Oskemen